Élan was the lead ship of the French  minesweeping sloops (Avisos dragueur de mines). She was built by the Lorient shipyard and launched on 27 July 1938. She was interned in Turkey in June 1941 and released to the Free French Naval Forces in December 1944.

She remained in French Navy service after the war, was decommissioned on 26 March 1958 and scrapped.

Notes

Sources
 

1938 ships
Ships built in France
Elan-class minesweeping sloops